Areca hutchinsoniana is a species of flowering plant in the family Arecaceae. It is found only on the island of Mindanao in the Philippines.

References

hutchinsoniana
Flora of Mindanao
Endangered plants
Taxa named by Odoardo Beccari
Taxonomy articles created by Polbot